Igor Petrović (Serbian Cyrillic: Игор Петровић; born 18 March 1987) is a Serbian footballer who plays for Trayal Kruševac.

References
 Profile and stats at Srbijafudbal
 Imscouting
 

1987 births
Living people
Sportspeople from Kruševac
Serbian footballers
FK Napredak Kruševac players
FK Mladost Lučani players
FK Moravac Mrštane players
Serbian SuperLiga players
Association football defenders
FK Temnić players